Pigmentiphaga litoralis is a gram-negative, oxidase and catalase-positive, facultatively anaerobic non-spore-forming, non-motile, rod-shaped bacterium from the genus Pigmentiphaga, which was isolated from a tidal flat sediment in the South China Sea in China. Colonies of P. litoralis are yellow colored.

References

External links
Type strain of Pigmentiphaga litoralis at BacDive -  the Bacterial Diversity Metadatabase

Burkholderiales
Bacteria described in 2009